Portunidae is a family of crabs which contains the swimming crabs.

Description
Portunid crabs are characterised by the flattening of the fifth pair of legs into broad paddles, which are used for swimming. This ability, together with their strong, sharp claws, allows many species to be fast and aggressive predators.

Examples
Its members include many well-known shoreline crabs, such as the European shore crab (Carcinus maenas), blue crab (Callinectes sapidus), and velvet crab (Necora puber). Two genera in the family are contrastingly named Scylla and Charybdis; the former contains the economically important species black crab (Scylla serrata) and Scylla paramamosain.

Taxonomy
The circumscription of the family varies, with some authors treating "Carcinidae", "Catoptridae" and "Macropipidae" as separate families, and others considering them subfamilies of a wider Portunidae. Swimming crabs reach their greatest species diversity in the Pacific and Indian Oceans.

Extinct genera are marked with an obelisk.

Caphyrinae Guérin, 1832
Caphyra Guérin, 1832
Coelocarcinus Edmondson, 1930
Lissocarcinus Adams & White, 1849
Mioxaiva † Müller, 1978
Carcininae MacLeay, 1838
Carcinus Leach, 1814
Cicarnus † Karasawa & Fudouji, 2000
Miopipus † Müller, 1984
Portumnus Leach, 1814
Xaiva MacLeay, 1838
Carupinae Paul’son, 1875
Carupa Dana, 1851
Catoptrus A. Milne-Edwards, 1870
Libystes A. Milne-Edwards, 1867
Neptocarcinus † Lőrenthey, 1898
Rakosia † Müller, 1984
Richerellus Manning & Felder, 1989
Podophthalminae Dana, 1851
Euphylax Stimpson, 1860
Podophthalmus Lamarck, 1801
Psygmophthalmus † Schweitzer, Iturralde-Vinent, Hetler & Velez-Juarbe, 2006
Sandomingia † Rathbun, 1919
Saratunus † Collins, Lee & Noad, 2003
Viaophthalmus † Karasawa, Schweitzer & Feldmann, 2008
Polybiinae Ortmann, 1893
Bathynectes Stimpson, 1871
Benthochascon Alcock & Anderson, 1899
Boschettia † Busulini, Tessier, Beschin & De Angeli, 2003
Brusinia Števčić, 1991
Coenophthalmus A. Milne-Edwards, 1879
Falsiportunites † Collins & Jakobsen, 2003
Gecchelicarcinus † Beschin, Busulini, De Angeli & Tessier, 2007
Liocarcinus Stimpson, 1871
Macropipus Prestandrea, 1833
Maeandricampus † Schweitzer & Feldmann, 2002
Megokkos † Schweitzer & Feldmann, 2000
Minohellenus † Karasawa, 1990
Necora Holthuis, 1987
Ophthalmoplax † Rathbun, 1935
Parathranites Miers, 1886
Pleolobites † Remy, 1960
Polybius Leach, 1820
Pororaria † Glaessner, 1980
Portufuria † Collins, Schulz & Jakobsen, 2005
Portunites † Bell, 1858
Proterocarcinus † Feldmann, Casadío, Chirino-Gálvez & Aguirre-Urreta, 1995
Raymanninus Ng, 2000
Rhachiosoma † Woodward, 1871
Portuninae Rafinesque, 1815
Acanthoportunus † Schweitzer & Feldmann, 2002
Arenaeus Dana, 1851
Atoportunus Ng & Takeda, 2003
Callinectes Stimpson, 1860
Carupella Lenz in Lenz & Strunck, 1914
Colneptunus † Lőrenthey in Lőrenthey & Beurlen, 1929
Cronius Stimpson, 1860
Euronectes † Karasawa, Schweitzer & Feldmann, 2008
Laleonectes Manning & Chace, 1990
Lupella Rathbun, 1897
Lupocyclus Adams & White, 1849
Necronectes † A. Milne-Edwards, 1881
Portunus Weber, 1795
Pseudoachelous † Portell & Collins, 2004
Rathbunella † Collins in Collins, Portell & Donovan, 2009
Sanquerus Manning, 1989
Scylla De Haan, 1833
Thalamitinae Paul’son, 1875
Charybdis De Haan, 1833
Eocharybdis † Beschin, Busulini, De Angeli & Tessier, 2002
Gonioinfradens Leene, 1938
Thalamita Latreille, 1829
Thalamitoides A. Milne-Edwards, 1869
incertae sedis
Enoplonotus † A. Milne-Edwards, 1860
Neptunus †  de Haan 1839

References

External links

Portunoidea
Taxa named by Constantine Samuel Rafinesque
Decapod families